The Visit may refer to:

Film and television
The Visit (1964 film), a 1964 adaptation of the Friedrich Dürrenmatt play starring Ingrid Bergman
The Visit (2000 film), directed by Jordan Walker-Pearlman
The Visit (2015 American film), a 2015 film by M. Night Shyamalan
The Visit (2015 Nigerian film), a 2015 film starring Nse Ikpe Etim and Femi Jacobs
The Visit (2015 film), a 2015 film by Danish director Michael Madsen
The Visit (TV series), a 2007 BBC sitcom

Literature and theatre
The Visit (play), a 1956 play by Friedrich Dürrenmatt
The Visit (poetry collection), a 1970 collection by Ian Hamilton
The Visit (musical), a 2001 Kander and Ebb musical adaptation of the Dürrenmatt play

Music
The Visit (Pat Martino album), a 1972 album by Pat Martino, and its title track
The Visit (EP), a 1980 EP by Ludus
The Visit (Loreena McKennitt album), 1991
"The Visit" (song), a 2000 song by Chad Brock

See also
Visit (disambiguation)